In geometry, Jung's theorem is an inequality between the diameter of a set of points in any Euclidean space and the radius of the minimum enclosing ball of that set. It is named after Heinrich Jung, who first studied this inequality in 1901. Algorithms also exist to solve the smallest-circle problem explicitly.

Statement 
Consider a compact set

and let

be the diameter of K, that is, the largest Euclidean distance between any two of its points. Jung's theorem states that there exists a closed ball with radius

that contains K.  The boundary case of equality is attained by the regular n-simplex.

Jung's theorem in the plane 
The most common case of Jung's theorem is in the plane, that is, when n = 2. In this case the theorem states that there exists a circle enclosing all points whose radius satisfies

and this bound is as tight as possible since when K is an equilateral triangle (or its three vertices) one has

General metric spaces 
For any bounded set  in any metric space, . Both these inequalities are tight:

 In a uniform metric space, that is, a space in which all distances are equal, . 

Versions of Jung's theorem for various non-Euclidean geometries are also known (see e.g. Dekster 1995, 1997).

References

External links 

Geometric inequalities
Euclidean geometry
Theorems in geometry
Metric geometry